Coetzee is an Afrikaans surname. It is the tenth most common family name in the Republic of South Africa.

Origin 
Unlike many other popular South-African family names, which can often be unambiguously traced back to English, Dutch, or Huguenot French, the origin of the name Coetzee is unclear. It is known that it dates back to the person Dirk Coetzee  who came to Cape Colony from Kampen in Netherlands in the 17th century.

Dutch linguist Jan-Wouter Zwart states the guess, in an informal essay, that it derived from the common Dutch name Koetsier, guided by the pronunciation.

Notable people with the surname "Coetzee" 
 Allister Coetzee (born 1963), South African rugby coach
 Angeline Coetzee, doctor who individuated Covid-19 Omicron variant
 Basil Coetzee (1944–1998), South African musician
 Clem Coetzee ( – 2006), Zimbabwean conservationist
 Danie Coetzee (born 1977), South African rugby union footballer
 Dirk Coetzee (1945–2013), co-founder and commander of the covert South African Police unit in the 1990s
 Felix Coetzee (born 1959), South African jockey in thoroughbred horse racing
 George Coetzee (born 1986), South African golfer
 Gerrie Coetzee (1955–2023), South African boxer
 Hannes Coetzee (born 1944), South African guitarist
 Hendrik Coetzee ( – 2010), South African adventurer
 Jandre Coetzee (born 1984), South African first class cricketer
 Jeff Coetzee (born 1977), South African tennis player
 J. M. Coetzee (born 1940), South African-Australian author awarded the 2003 Nobel Prize in Literature
 Justin Coetzee (born 1984), South African-Australian cricketer
 Lee Coetzee (born 1984), South African cricketer
 Maureen Coetzee (born 1951), South African entomologist
 Pietie Coetzee (born 1978), South African field hockey player
 Price Coetzee (born 1946), South African actor
 Rivaldo Coetzee (born 1996), South African footballer
 Roean Coetzee (born 1974), rugby union footballer
 Ryan Coetzee (born 1973), South African politician and political strategist, businessman
 Ryan Coetzee (swimmer) (born 1995), South African swimmer
 Tansey Coetzee (born 1984), Miss South Africa 2008

See also
Kotze / Kotzé, alternative spelling, notable people carrying the surname

References 

Afrikaans-language surnames
Surnames of Hungarian origin